Le Mouvement social is a French-language quarterly journal of social history.

Further reading 

 Roberto Ceamanos Llorens, De la historia del movimiento obrero a la historia social. L´Actualité de l´Histoire (1951-1960) y Le Mouvement Social (1960-2000), Zaragoza, Prensas Universitarias de Zaragoza, 2004. .
 Roberto Ceamanos Llorens, Historia obrera e historia social en Francia (1950-1980), Zaragoza, Prensas Universitarias de Zaragoza, 2004. .
 Roberto Ceamanos Llorens, Militancia y Universidad. La construcción de la historia obrera en Francia, Valencia, Fundación Instituto de Historia Social-UNED, 2005. .

External links 

 

French-language journals
European history journals